Hockey, or more specifically, field hockey, was first introduced to the Australian Youth Olympic Festival as a men's and women's tournament at the 2007 Games.

History
After being introduced in the 2007 Australian Youth Olympic Festival, field hockey as become a permanent feature at every edition since.

Australia are the most successful team in the men's competition, having won gold at every edition of the tournament. Great Britain are the most successful women's team, having one the tournament twice, followed by Australia who have won the tournament once.

Men's tournament

Summaries

Team Appearances

Women's tournament

Summaries

Team Appearances

Medal table

Total

Men

Women

References

External links

 
Australian Youth Olympic Festival
International field hockey competitions hosted by Australia
Australian Youth Olympic Festival